The Martin Luther King Jr. Highway Line, designated Route A12 is a daily bus route operated by the Washington Metropolitan Area Transit Authority between Addison Road station of the Blue and Silver Lines of the Washington Metro and Capital Plaza Mall. The line operates every 20 minutes between 7AM and 9PM, 30 minutes after 9PM weekdays and 60 minutes after 9PM weekends. Route A12 trips roughly take 55 minutes. On Sundays, Route A12 is extended to Capitol Heights station replacing a portion of route F14.

Current route 
Route A12 operates daily between Capital Plaza and Addison Road station providing service among the Landover community. On Sundays, route A12 is extended to Capitol Heights station replacing a portion of route F14 since the F14 does not run on Sundays. 
Route A12 currently gets its buses out of Landover division.

A12 Stops

History 
The Martin Luther King Jr. Highway Line began in 1978 consisting of routes A11, A12, A13, A15, and A17. Routes A11 and A12 operated between Capital Plaza and Federal Triangle in Downtown Washington D.C., via Annapolis Road, Baltimore Washington Parkway, Landover Road, Palmer Highway, Marlboro Pike, Pennsylvania Avenue, Independence Avenue, and Constitution Avenue. Route A13 operated between Federal Triangle and Washington Business Park and routes A15 and A17 provided weekday peak hour service between Dodge Park and Federal Triangle.

Route A12 originally operated by the Bradbury Heights Bus Line as the Kent Village Line in 1922. It then operated under the Washington Marlboro & Annapolis Motor Lines Inc. (WM&A). It also operated under the District Heights Line but was later replaced by the P12 and V14. The line was later acquired by WMATA on February 4, 1973.

On November 21, 1978 when Landover station opened, routes A11, A13, A15, and A17 were discontinued and route A12 was shorten to Potomac Avenue station discontinuing service to Downtown. Routes A11, A15, and A17 were replaced by both route A12 and the Orange Line while route A13 was replaced by route F13.

On November 22, 1980, when Addison Road station and Capitol Heights station opened, A12 was shortened even further to operate between Capital Plaza and Addison Road station Mondays through Saturdays, as both the Orange and Blue Lines would provide much faster and direct service between much of Prince George's County and Downtown Washington D.C. Route A12 was also extended to operate to Capitol Heights station via, East Capitol Street on Sundays replacing a portion of route F14 which doesn't operate on Sundays.

Route A11 was also reincarnated on November 22, 1980 to make a one way trip between Capital Plaza to Federal Triangle on Saturday mornings only before the first Orange Line trip from the New Carrollton station departs. Route A11 would mainly operate using the A12's former routing between Capital Plaza and the Federal Triangle in Downtown Washington D.C., except it would not serve Landover station.

In 1983, route A15 was reincarnated to operate between Capital Plaza and Addison Road station via Landsdowne Village Apartments in Landover, MD during weekday peak periods using the same routing as A12 but instead serving Landsdowne Village Apartments.

On December 15, 2004, route A15 was discontinued and replaced by routes A11, A12, and Prince George's County's The Bus Route 22. Alternative service was provided by routes A12 between Capital Plaza and Landover Mall and The Bus Route 22 operated between Landover Mall and Landsdowne Village Apartments, via Morgan Boulevard station.

Even after Landover Mall had closed in 2002, routes A11 & A12 would still loop around the former mall due to Sears still being opened. On March 30, 2014, both A11 & A12 were rerouted to no longer serve the former site of the Landover Mall and were rerouted to operate  along Brightseat Road, Glenarden Parkway, Ardwick Ardmore Road, Martin Luther King Jr. Highway, via route F14's routing, to provide weekly Metrobus service to Glenarden, due to Sears announcing that its Landover store will close in March 2014. This routing gives direct bus service to Landover station as it was only previously provided between Glenarden and New Carrollton station.

In 2014, WMATA proposed to split the A12 into two routes with the A12 running between Addison Road station and New Carrollton station via Brightseat Road and Ardwick Industrial Park and discontinuing service to Capital Plaza and Landover station primarily running along Martin Luther King Jr. Highway. A new Route L12 will operate the A12 routing between Capital Plaza and Largo Town Center station via Landover station and Woodmore Town Center primarily running on Landover Road via Palmer Park and Hawthorne Street running along the old A12 routing. Stops between Martin Luther King Jr. Hwy and Brightseat Road will be replaced by a rerouted route F14 which will discontinue service along a portion of Brightseat Road being replaced by Route A12. Public feedback however opposed to the changes and the reroutes were not implemented.

On March 29, 2015, route A11 was discontinued making route A12 the only Route to operate the Martin Luther King Jr. Highway Line.

During the COVID-19 pandemic, route A12 was reduced to operate on its Saturday supplemental schedule beginning on March 16, 2020. However beginning on March 18, 2020, route A12 was further reduced to operate on its Sunday schedule operating between Capital Plaza and Capitol Heights station. Weekend service was also suspended beginning on March 21, 2020. Weekend service was restored on a limited basis on July 18, 2020. Full service resumed on August 23, 2020.

In 2023, WMATA brought back the proposed A12 and L12 route split which is roughly the same from the 2014 proposals, however, the F14 would not be rerouted along Brightseat Road.

References

External links
 A12 Martin Luther King Jr. Highway Line – wmata.com

A12